"New Sensation" is the seventh single by Japanese singer and voice actress Nana Mizuki.

Track listing 
 New Sensation
 Lyrics, composition, arrangement: Toshiro Yabuki

 Lyric, composition: Chiyomaru Shikura
 Arrangement: Tsutomu Ohira, Toshimichi Isoe
 Opening theme for PS2 game You That Become A Memory ~Memories Off~
 HONEY FLOWER
 Composition: Akimitsu Honma
 Arrangement: Akimitsu Honma, Tsutomu Ohira
 New Sensation (Off Vocal ver.)
  (Off Vocal ver.)
 HONEY FLOWER (Off Vocal ver.)

Charts

2003 singles
Nana Mizuki songs
Songs written by Toshiro Yabuki